The 2011–12 KB Kookmin Card Professional Basketball season was the 16th season of the Korean Basketball League.

Regular season

Playoffs

Prize money
Wonju Dongbu Promy: KRW 100,000,000 (regular-season 1st place)
Anyang KGC: KRW 50,000,000 (regular-season 2nd place)
Busan KT Sonicboom: KRW 30,000,000 (regular-season 3rd place)

External links
Official KBL website (Korean & English)

2010–11
2011–12 in South Korean basketball
2011–12 in Asian basketball leagues